Scavenger is the fourth studio album by The Walkabouts released September 1, 1991 on Sub Pop Records.  It received national exposure in the United States through NPR. The album is available in various forms (CD, cassette, digital download) from Amazon.com and as digital download from iTunes Store in the US and the United Kingdom among others.

Scavenger was produced by Gary Smith and features guest appearances by Brian Eno and Natalie Merchant.

Track listing
Source: AllMusic

All songs written by The Walkabouts, except where noted. All lyrics written by Chris Eckman, except where noted.

 "Dead Man Rise" – 3:27
 "Stir the Ashes" – 3:45
 "The Night Watch" – 3:28
 "Hangman" – 4:59
 "Where the Deep Water Goes" – 3:11
 "Blown Away" – 3:43
 "Nothing Is a Stranger" – 4:18
 "Let's Burn Down the Cornfield" (Randy Newman) – 2:51
 "River Blood" – 3:03
 "Train to Mercy" (string arrangement by Mark Nichols) – 9:27

The album was recorded at Steve Larsons Studios in Seattle during September and October 1990. Mixing was done in October 1990 at The Carriage House, Stamford, Connecticut. "River Blood" was remixed by Gary Smith and Matt Lane in December 1990 at The Carriage House. Additional recordings were done in the Skyline Studios, New York. The album was mastered at the Skyline Studios.

Release history

Personnel  

 The Walkabouts

 Glenn Slater – organ, piano, synthesizer, accordion
 Grant Eckman – drums
 Carla Torgerson – vocals, acoustic guitars, electric guitars, cello
 Michael Wells – bass
 Chris Eckman – vocals, electric guitars

 Additional musician

 Brian Eno – synthesizer, backup vocals on "Train to Mercy"
 Natalie Merchant – harmony vocals on "Where the Deep Water Goes"
 Larry Barrett – mandolin on "Where the Deep Water Goes"
 Gary Smith – tambourine on "Dead Man Rise" and "Stir the Ashes", Deepwater synthesizer on "Where the Deep Water Goes", Morricone keyboard on "Blown Way"
 Steve Haigler – sleigh bells on "Train to Mercy"

 Bravura String Quartet
strings on "Train to Mercy"
 Dave Beck – cello
 Steven Toda – violin
 Gregg Rice – violin
 Sam Williams – viola

 Technical personnel

 Gary Smith – production, mixing on "River Blood"
 Ed Brooks – engineering
 Steve Haigler – mixing
 Jim Haviland – recording technician
 Bruce Calder – additional recording
 Sam Hofstedt – engineering assistant
 Matt Lane – mixing assistant, mixing on "River Blood"
 Greg Calbi – mastering

 Additional personnel

 Jane Higgins – design
 Tony Kroes – design, paintings
 Charles Peterson – color photo
 Chris Peters – paintings

Critical reception 

Jason Ankeny writing in a positive review for AllMusic said: "like its predecessors, Cataract, [Scavenger] refines the Walkabouts' sound even as the band's scope broadens."

References

1991 albums
The Walkabouts albums
Sub Pop albums